Ascanio Libertano (also Ascanio Libertani)(died 10 March 1607) was a Roman Catholic prelate who served as Bishop of Cagli (1591–1607).

Biography
On 19 July 1591, Ascanio Libertano was appointed during the papacy of Pope Gregory XIV as Bishop of Cagli. On 4 August 1591, he was consecrated bishop by Girolamo Bernerio, Bishop of Ascoli Piceno, with Paolo Alberi, Archbishop Emeritus of Dubrovnik, and Leonard Abel, Titular Bishop of Sidon, serving as co-consecrators. He served as Bishop of Cagli until his death on 10 March 1607.

References

External links and additional sources

16th-century Italian Roman Catholic bishops
17th-century Italian Roman Catholic bishops
Bishops appointed by Pope Gregory XIV
1607 deaths
Inquisitors of Malta